The 2022–23 Baylor Bears women's basketball team represented Baylor University in the 2022–23 NCAA Division I women's basketball season. The Bears, members of the Big 12 Conference, played their home games at the Ferrell Center in Waco, Texas and are led by second-year head coach Nicki Collen.

Previous season
The Lady Bears finished the 2021–22 season with a record of 28–7, 15–3 in Big 12 to win the Big 12 regular season title. They defeated Oklahoma State and Oklahoma in the quarterfinals and semifinals to advanced to the championship game of the Big 12 women's tournament where they lost to Texas. They received an at-large bid to the NCAA tournament in the Wichita Region, they defeated Hawaii in the first round before getting upset by South Dakota in the second round.

Offseason

Departures

Incoming

Recruiting

Recruiting class of 2023

Roster

Schedule and results
Source:

|-
!colspan=12 style=| Exhibition

|-
!colspan=12 style=| Non-conference regular season

|-
!colspan=9 style=""| Big 12 regular season

|-
!colspan=12 style=| Big 12 Tournament

|-
!colspan=9 style=| NCAA tournament

Rankings

*Coaches did not release a week 1 poll.

See also
2022–23 Baylor Bears men's basketball team

References

Baylor Bears women's basketball seasons
Baylor
Baylor
Baylor
Baylor